Lividity is the third full-length studio album by American metalcore band It Dies Today. Originally scheduled for release in 2008, the album's release date was repeatedly pushed back by Trustkill Records.  It was finally released on September 15, 2009. It is the band's first album featuring Jason Wood on vocals after the departure of former lead singer and founding member Nicholas Brooks.

A "Deluxe Edition" was released on the same date, which included a bonus DVD. The bonus DVD features a 37-minute "making of" documentary, entitled "Faking the Record" (including a secondary audio track featuring commentary by the band themselves), a "making of" featurette for the "Thank You for Drinking" video, as well as the video itself. The video appears to be a "preliminary" or "rough" cut (production notes and counters are visible, with header/footer bars), although it is not clear if this was done intentionally, or if the video was not yet finalized at the time of the pressing.

Track listing
 "This Ghost" - 2:53
 "Reckless Abandon" - 3:55
 "Thank You for Drinking" - 3:02
 "Miss October"  - 4:09
 "Bled Out in Black and White" - 3:13
 "Martyr of Truth" - 3:56
 "Nihility"  - 3:18
 "Life of Uncertainty" - 4:48
 "The Architects"  - 3:33
 "Complacence without Pursuit (Lividity)"  - 4:36
 "Come Undone" (Duran Duran cover)  - 7:45*

* actual song length is 4:20, followed by 0:15 of silence, then a 3:10 hidden track which also referred as "Thank You for Drinking (Other Version)"

Personnel
Jason Wood- vocals
Chris Cappelli- guitar
Mike Hatalak- guitar
Steve Lemke- bass
Nick Mirusso- drums

References

External links
Trustkill Records  "It Dies Today" Retrieved on 05/04/09
Official MySpace  Retrieved on 08/03/09

2009 albums
It Dies Today albums
Trustkill Records albums